Pallet on the Floor is a 1986 New Zealand made drama/comedy, based on the final novel by Ronald Hugh Morrieson. Shot in 1983 at Patea, partly in a closed-down abattoir, the film was given limited release in New Zealand three years later.

The main role of abattoir worker Sam Jamieson is played by veteran actor Peter McCauley.

Pallet on the Floor is the only feature film directed by Lynton Butler, who earlier made One of those Blighters, a television production which fictionalised Morrieson's life.

Actor and musician Bruno Lawrence contributed to the jazz score, and has a small cameo role playing Morrieson as a bass player at a wedding.

The focus of the plot was shifted to the character of the British remittance man in the hope that Peter O’Toole would take the role. This did not occur. While billed as comedy, the film depicts 1960s racism and class divisions, and maintains Morrieson's trademark preoccupations .... of sex, death, mateship, voyeurism, violence, booze and mayhem in bleak small town New Zealand.

Plot

Life was hard enough for Sam Jamieson without Jack Voot's lechery and Miriam Breen's jealousy. Then life at Kurikino erupted into a sensation of murder and blackmail, turning his life into a nightmare from which the efforts of Tinny Entwistle, Gigglejuice Saunders and the Remittance Man could not save him. But Spud McGhee had an idea .... . Sam never gets round to working on his cottage, he goes to the Brian Boru the only hotel in Kurikino, run by Amos Blennerhasset. Wife Sue is pregnant. Sam works at 'the big slaughter-house across the bridge at the foot of the hill' known as 'the Works'.

Cast
 Peter McCauley as Sam Jamieson
 Jillian O'Brien as Sue Jamieson
 Bruce Spence as Basil Beaumont-Foster (the Remittance Man) 
 Shirley Gruar as Miriam Breen 
 Alastair Douglas as Stan Breem 
 Tony Barry as Larkman (the cop) 
 Jeremy Stephens as Spud McGhee
 Michael Wilson as Shorty Larsen
 Terence Cooper as Brendon O'Keefe 
 John Bach as Jack Voot 
 Marshall Napier as Joe Voot 
 Curly del Monte as Mason Voot 
 Peter Rowley as Henderson
 Ian Watkin as Amos
 Sonny Waru as Mohi Te Kiri 
 John Rist as Gigglejuice Saunders 
 Bruno Lawrence as Ronald Hugh Morrieson

External links
 
 
 Pallet on the Floor at NZonScreen (with video extracts)

References

1986 films
New Zealand comedy horror films
Films set in New Zealand
1980s comedy horror films
Films set in the 1960s
Films shot in New Zealand
Films based on New Zealand novels
1986 comedy films
1980s English-language films